Voices of Bam ( / ) is a 2006 Dutch-made documentary feature film about 2003 Bam earthquake. The film was produced and directed by Dutch filmmakers Aliona van der Horst.

The film is inspired by photographs that were recovered from the town's debris... the only tangible mementoes left of life before the earthquake.

See also
Bam 6.6

References

External links
 
 "Voices of Bam: Nederlands Film Festival

2006 films
2006 documentary films
Documentary films about Iran
Documentary films about earthquakes
Dutch documentary films